Bhattu Kalan is a town in Fatehabad district of Haryana, India.
Khurd and Kalan Persian language word which means small and Big respectively when two villages have same name then it is distinguished as Kalan means Big and Khurd means Small with Village Name.

It falls under the Hisar Division and is located 57 kilometres north from Hisar. There is Rail Connectivity to Delhi, Bathinda, Hisar.

Education
 Government College, Bhattu
Shanti Niketan (S.N) Model High School (BSEH)
Saraswati Vidya Mandir Sr. Sec. School (BSEH) 
Balaji Public School (HBSE)
Mother Teresa Convent School (CBSE)
Satluj Public School (CBSE)
National Montessori Convent School (CBSE)
Bhattu Library Club (Reg.)
Mother Pride Convent School Bhattu Mandi (English Medium)
M D A V Sr Sec School

See also

 Bhatti
 Bhattiana
 Banawali – a nearby village and Saraswati Civilization site
 Jandwala Bagar – a nearby village
 List of villages in Fatehabad district

References

External links

Villages in Fatehabad district